General Augereau (or General Angereaux)  was a ketch launched in 1801 and recommissioned in Bayonne in 1803 as a privateer. She made a small number of captures during her first cruise, but then the British Royal Navy captured her in February 1805 during her second cruise. She became a British merchantman, sailing between Cork and Liverpool, and was last listed in 1813.

French privateer
General Augereau was recommissioned as a privateer in Bayonne in July 1803. From July 1803 to September 1804, she was under the command of Étienne Pellot, with 11 officers, 74 men, and 12 carronades.

On 2 May 1804 Ranger, Phelps, master, and Mary Ann, Doyle, master, sailed from Waterford, bound for Newfoundland. On 6 May General Angereaux, of Bayonne, 16 guns and 120 men, captured them about 160 miles from Cape Clear Island. General Angereaux plundered Ranger, but then gave her up to the crews and passengers of both vessels. Ranger arrived back at Waterford on 10 May. Mary Ann was sent for Spain or France. 

In April 1804 General Angereaux captured and sank Sisters, Rowe, master, which was on a voyage from Dartmouth, Devon to Newfoundland. General Angereaux put the crew aboard Sampson, which arrived at Torbay.

On 6 June the "privateer Angereau" captured Zephyr, Jackson, master, which was on her way from Gibraltar and Lisbon to Cork. The capture took place off Cape Clear. Angereau took Zephyr into Muros. On the same cruise she also captured Marguerite, Marianne, and Lovely.

On 4 August 1804  was returning to Liverpool from Demerara when General Augereau, of 12 guns and 90 men, captured her. In the action leading up to the capture, Captain Phillips, his son, a passenger, and a seaman were killed, and the mate, a passenger and seven seamen wounded; General Auguereau had three men killed and her captain and five men wounded. On 9 August  recaptured William Heathcote and sent her into Plymouth. 

On 8 August 1804  encountered General Augereau and chased her for three days, but General Augereaux eventually escaped in light winds.

General Augereau was under the command of a different captain from  late 1804 to February 1805, with 70 to 88 men, until  captured her on 13 February 1805 in the Caribbean. "General Angereau" arrived at Cork in March. She was armed with fourteen  12-pounder carronades, had a crew of 88 men, and had been out 47 days without having captured anything.

English merchantman
General Angereau first appeared in Lloyd's Register (LR) in 1805.

Fate
General Angereaux was last listed in 1813.

Citations

References

See also
 

1801 ships
Ships built in France
Privateer ships of France
Captured ships
Age of Sail merchant ships of England